Real-world economics is a school of economics that uses an inductive method to understand economic processes. It approaches economics without making a priori assumptions about how ideal markets work, in contrast to what Nobel Prize-winning economist, Ronald Coase, referred to as "blackboard economics" and its deductive method.

See also 
 Post-autistic economics
 Heterodox economics
 Complexity economics
 Pluralism in economics
 Humanistic economics
 Real-World Economics Review
 Historical school of economics

References

External links
 Real-World Economics Review
 Examples of real-world economics concepts from the American Economic Association
 Real-world economics explained at The Economics Network
 Foundations of Real-World Economics at Harvard Summer School

Economic ideologies
Schools of economic thought